St. Mary of Perpetual Help - historic church of the Roman Catholic Archdiocese of Chicago located in the Bridgeport neighborhood of Chicago, Illinois.

It is a prime example of the so-called Polish Cathedral style of churches in both its opulence and grand scale. Along with St. Barbara's in Chicago, it is one of two monumental religious edifices found in this near South Side neighborhood.

History
Founded in 1882 as a Polish parish, it remained a parish for Polish workers in the Union Stockyards until the yards closed in the early 1970s. 
In recent years the neighborhood has seen a growth in new housing and has seen an influx of new residents of many backgrounds and cultures.

St. Mary of Perpetual Help was built from the same or a similar plan as St. Casimir Church in Detroit in 1889, which was razed in 1961.

Architecture
The church designed by Henry Engelbert in a Romanesque-Byzantine style, was completed in 1889.  The brick exterior hides a lavishly shaped and opulently decorated interior enriched with stations of the cross and stained glass windows with Polish inscriptions. Three domes sail above, the central dome lit by a ring of lantern windows and towering  over the neighborhood. Since 1999, the church has undergone extensive restoration of the original structure, the interior decoration by John A. Mallin in 1961 and the 1928 Austin organ, Opus 1602. The historic paintings in the Shrine Altars which date to 1890, were recently restored by the Art Institute of Chicago.  The Joyful Mysteries are depicted in the "Shrine of our Blessed Mother", while the "Shrine of St. Joseph" holds paintings of the Holy Family, the Flight into Egypt and the Marriage of Joseph and Mary. The nave is decorated with fine scaliola work and a suspended pulpit is topped by a wedding cake cupola. A new mosaic of Our Lady of Perpetual Help by the Soprani Studios of Rome was recently installed, as well as the contents of a time capsule of precious historical documents.

References

External links
PGSA - St. Mary of Perpetual Help Church History
Parish Web site

See also
Tadeusz Żukotyński, Catholic fine art painter and mural artist
Sr. Maria Stanisia, Polish-American fine art painter and restoration artist
Jozef Mazur, Polish-American painter and stainglass artist
Polish Cathedral style churches of Chicago
Polish Americans
Poles in Chicago
Polish Roman Catholic Union of America
Roman Catholicism in Poland

Mary of Perpetual Help
Polish Cathedral style architecture
Religious organizations established in 1882
Roman Catholic churches completed in 1889
19th-century Roman Catholic church buildings in the United States
Mary of Perpetual Help
Henry Engelbert church buildings